The 2007 South American Youth Championship (Sudamericano Sub-20) was the 23rd edition of the competition. It was played in Paraguay between 7 and 28 January 2007, and was contested by all ten U-20 national football teams of CONMEBOL. This was the fourth time Paraguay hosted the competition. Brazil finished undefeated and won their ninth title, beating rivals Argentina in the final.

Format
The teams are separated in two groups of five, and each team plays four matches in a pure round-robin stage. The three top competitors advance to a single final group of six, wherein each team plays five matches. The top four teams in the final group qualify to the 2007 FIFA U-20 World Cup, while the top two also qualify for the 2008 Olympic tournament (U-23).

Squads
For a list of all the squads in the final tournament, see 2007 South American Youth Championship squads.

The following teams entered the tournament:

 
 
 
 
 
 
 
  (host)

First group stage

Group A

Group B

Final group

Fixtures

Winners

Qualifiers for the 2007 FIFA U-20 World Cup

Qualifiers for the 2008 Olympic Games of Beijing

Topscorers
 Edinson Cavani 7
 Arturo Vidal 6
 Nicolás Medina 5
 Alexandre Pato 5
 Lucas 4
 Pablo Mouche 3
 Ismael Sosa 3
 Tchô 3
 Nicolás Larrondo 3
 Javier Acuña 3
 Cristian Bogado 3

Notes
Argentina and Brazil were looking to finish in the top 4 in order to qualify for the World Youth Championship, a competition which the two sides have thoroughly dominated, having won 9 of the 16 World Youth titles between them.
The hosts Paraguay were also hoping to do well, they had finished in the top two every time they have hosted the event before, but they had a disappointing campaign, finishing fifth, missing out on a place in the World Youth Championship altogether.
Colombia were the defending champions and the only team other than Brazil, Argentina and Uruguay to have won the tournament on more than one occasion.
Chile were looking to qualify for the world Youth Championship, they managed to qualify in 2005 with only 5 points from 5 games, this time around they qualified with 6 points from 5 games.
The club teams that contributed the most players to the tournament are:
8:  Alianza Lima, Peru
7:   Sporting Cristal, Peru
6:   Racing Club, Argentina
5:   Boca Juniors, Argentina 
5:   Colo-Colo, Chile
5:   Club Sport Emelec, Ecuador
5:   Club Libertad, Paraguay
5:   Danubio, Uruguay
5:   Caracas FC, Venezuela
Only two clubs from outside South America contributed more than one player to the tournament:
2:   Cádiz, Spain
2:   Udinese, Italy

South American Youth Championship
South American Youth Championship
South American Youth Championship
CONMEBOL
International association football competitions hosted by Paraguay
2007 in youth association football